In algebra, given a ring R, the category of left modules over R is the category whose objects are all left modules over R and whose morphisms are all module homomorphisms between left R-modules. For example, when R is the ring of integers Z, it is the same thing as the category of abelian groups. The category of right modules is defined in a similar way.

Note: Some authors use the term module category for the category of modules. This term can be ambiguous since it could also refer to a category with a monoidal-category action.

Properties 
The categories of left and right modules are abelian categories. These categories have enough projectives and enough injectives. Mitchell's embedding theorem states every abelian category arises as a full subcategory of the category of modules.

Projective limits and inductive limits exist in the categories of left and right modules.

Over a commutative ring, together with the tensor product of modules ⊗, the category of modules is a symmetric monoidal category.

Category of vector spaces 

The category K-Vect (some authors use VectK) has all vector spaces over a field K as objects, and K-linear maps as morphisms. Since vector spaces over K (as a field) are the same thing as modules over the ring K, K-Vect is a special case of R-Mod (some authors use ModR), the category of left R-modules.

Much of linear algebra concerns the description of K-Vect. For example, the dimension theorem for vector spaces says that the isomorphism classes in K-Vect correspond exactly to the cardinal numbers, and that K-Vect is equivalent to the subcategory of K-Vect which has as its objects the vector spaces Kn, where n is any cardinal number.

Generalizations 
The category of sheaves of modules over a ringed space also has enough injectives (though not always enough projectives).

See also 
 Algebraic K-theory (the important invariant of the category of modules.)
 Category of rings
 Derived category
 Module spectrum
 Category of graded vector spaces
 Category of abelian groups
 Category of representations

References

Bibliography

External links 
http://ncatlab.org/nlab/show/Mod

Vector spaces
Linear algebra